I Know What I'm Living For (German: Ich weiß, wofür ich lebe) is a 1955 West German drama film directed by Paul Verhoeven and starring Luise Ullrich, Robert Freitag and Lil Dagover.  It was shot at the Bavaria Studios in Munich and on location around Baierbrunn and Garmisch-Partenkirchen. The film's sets were designed by the art directors Ernst H. Albrecht and Paul Markwitz.

Cast
 Luise Ullrich as 	Maria Pfluger
 Robert Freitag as 	Peter Neumann, Mechaniker
 Lil Dagover as 	Alice Lechaudier
 Ruth Stephan as 	Anna, Wirtschafterin bei Maria
 Ernst Ginsberg as Dr. Grumbach, RA.
 Werner Fuetterer as Dr. Schneider, RA.
 Antonia Mittrowsky as 	Frl. Fährmann, Jugendfürsogerin
 Gert Fröbe as 	Pfeifer, Inspektor Jugendfürsorge
 Michael Ande as 	Pit
 Knut Mahlke as Jascho
 Louise Kleve		
 Leo Fischer
 Otto Clemente	
 Wolf Ackva	
 Hans Henn	
 Hans Cossy		
 Heinz Peter Scholz	
 Otto Brüggemann	
 Rudolf Reiff		
 Joachim Teege		
 Heini Göbel		
 Leo Siedler	
 Franz Loskarn	
 Barbara Gallauner	
 Ingeborg Thiede	
 Rolf Kralovitz		
 Beppo Schwaiger	
 Walter Sedlmayr

References

Bibliography
 Bock, Hans-Michael & Bergfelder, Tim. The Concise CineGraph. Encyclopedia of German Cinema. Berghahn Books, 2009.
 Wolfgram, Mark. "Getting History Right": East and West German Collective Memories of the Holocaust and War. Rowman & Littlefield, 2011.

External links 
 

1955 films
1955 drama films
German drama films
West German films
1950s German-language films
1950s German films
Films directed by Paul Verhoeven (Germany)
Gloria Film films
Films shot in Bavaria
Films shot at Bavaria Studios

de:Ich weiß, wofür ich lebe